"Got to Have Your Love" is a song by American hip hop and electro funk group Mantronix, featuring vocals from American recording artist Wondress. It was released by Capitol Records in December 1989 as the lead single from Mantronix's fourth studio album, This Should Move Ya (1990). The song is written by band members Bryce Wilson and Kurtis Mantronik along with Johnny D. Rodriguez, and produced by Mantronix. It reached number four in the UK, number seven in Finland and number eight in Ireland. It is recognized as the group's signature song.

Song information
"Got to Have Your Love" was written by Mantronix members Bryce Wilson and Kurtis Mantronik, alongside Johnny D. Rodriguez. Mantronik stated that "When I did 'Got to Have Your Love', I did it for a reason. I did it because I wanted to get a song on the radio."

Critical reception
Upon the release, Bill Coleman from Billboard wrote that here, the act "is back on the right track with an R&B-textured hip-hop track (à la vintage Joyce Sims) sporting a sensuous vocal performance by newcomer Wondress. Black radio needs to be on this tip as well." Dave Obee from Calgary Herald complimented the group for "find[ing] a funky groove". A reviewer from Melody Maker felt that they "returns with what is basically a half-hearted hip-house thang", calling it "slappy, slushy and slumped at the waist." Pan-European magazine Music & Media viewed it as "attractive hip/house featuring a melodic and soulful lead vocal by Wondress. Classy stuff." David Giles from Music Week remarked that Mantronik "appears to have stepped into Soul II Soul/Inner City domain, roping in a bluesy female vocalist and coating her in swooming strings (sampled naturally). Altogether a funker effort than those of his UK counterparts". Jack Barron  from NME wrote, "Curtis has obviously been listening to Soul II Soul over there in New York and here compresses together a woman singer called Wondress (what a groovy name) and a rapper on an organic shuffle. Not instantaneous, but I've got a feeling 'Got to Have Your Love' is one of those records which will creep up on you like infatuation as opposed to some pug ugly swine with an axe in its trotter." Miranda Sawyer from Smash Hits called it "perfection".

Retrospective response
In his retrospective review of the This Should Move Ya album, Ron Wynn from AllMusic described "Got to Have Your Love" as a "strong single". While reviewing the compilation album The Best Of: 1985-1999, Andy Crysell from NME stated that the song "remains a bewitching soul classic".

Music video
The song's accompanying music video includes a cameo by former child model and now music producer Felix Howard.

Track listing
 "Got to Have Your Love" (Club with Bonus Beats) – 8:23
 "Got to Have Your Love" (Hard to Get Rap) – 2:48
 "Got to Have Your Love" (Luv Dub) – 6:23
 "Got to Have Your Love" (club edit) – 5:25
 "Got to Have Your Love" (instrumental) – 3:36
 "Got to Have Your Love" (radio edit) – 4:12

Charts

Weekly charts

Year-end charts

Liberty X version

In 2002, English-Irish music group Liberty X recorded "Got to Have Your Love" for their debut studio album, Thinking It Over (2002). It was one of three tracks to be recorded for the British version of the album, as it did not feature on the original edition, To Those Who Wait. The song was released on September 9, 2002, as the fourth single from the album and reached number two on the UK Singles Chart. It also charted at number eight in Ireland and number 12 in the Netherlands.

Music video
The song's accompanying music video was  filmed at Silent Waters in Montego Bay, Jamaica. It was directed by Alex Hemming and Shay Ola.

Track listing
 UK CD1
 "Got to Have Your Love" – 3:52
 "Good Love" – 3:53
 "Get with You" – 4:00

 UK CD2
 "Got to Have Your Love" (Jam & Faces Vamp mix) – 5:50
 "Got to Have Your Love" (Harry's 3 Way Action mix) – 7:10
 "Got to Have Your Love" (Shanghai Surprise mix) – 6:45

 UK cassette single
 "Got to Have Your Love" – 3:52
 "Just a Little" (Radio 1 remix) – 4:08
 "Everything" – 3:52

Charts

Weekly charts

Year-end charts

Release history

References

1989 singles
1989 songs
2002 singles
Capitol Records singles
Films set in Jamaica
Films shot in Jamaica
Liberty X songs
Songs written by Bryce Wilson
UK Independent Singles Chart number-one singles
V2 Records singles